Anthony Robert Julius (born 16 July 1956) is a British solicitor advocate known for being Diana, Princess of Wales' divorce lawyer and for representing Deborah Lipstadt. He is a partner at the law firm Mishcon de Reya.

He holds the chair in Law and Arts in the Faculty of Laws at University College London. He is also chairman of the economics consultancy, Oxera.

Life
The son of a London menswear retailer who died young from a brain tumour, Julius was educated at the City of London School. He studied English literature at Jesus College, Cambridge, graduating in 1977 with a first class degree; in the mid-1990s he completed a PhD in English literature at University College London under the novelist and academic Dan Jacobson. He joined the Bloomsbury law firm Mishcon de Reya in 1979, becoming a partner in 1984. Currently, he is deputy chairman of the firm.[3]

Activities

Julius is a commercial litigator. He is a specialist in the fields of defamation, international trade disputes, and media law. He has been a solicitor advocate since at least 2001,[4] which allows him to act as a barrister in so far as he can now appear in the High Court and the Court of Appeal.

He was selected by Diana, Princess of Wales, as her legal representative when she divorced Charles, Prince of Wales, in 1996. He was vice-president of the Diana, Princess of Wales Memorial Fund, until it closed in 2012. He was one of the charity's founding trustees and its first chairman until 1999.

He represented Deborah Lipstadt, successfully defending her in Irving v Penguin Books and Lipstadt, with Richard Rampton QC, against a libel suit brought against her by the Holocaust denier David Irving. Lipstadt and her publishers were vindicated by the judge's ruling in April 2000. A feature film about the case, Denial, with Andrew Scott playing Julius, was released in 2016.

Julius is legal advisor to the Foundation of Jewish Heritage.

He has written a number of books on various topics, outlined below, including his PhD thesis, in which he charged T. S. Eliot with antisemitism. He is writing his fifth book, on censorship of the arts in liberal democracies, which is due for release in 2020.

Julius is an advisory editor at the current affairs journal Fathom.[5]  He was a founding member of both Engage and the Euston Manifesto. From 2011 to 2014 he was chairman of the board of The Jewish Chronicle.[2]

From 1996 to 1998 he was a part-time lecturer at the Law Faculty of University College London. In 2017 he rejoined University College London as the inaugural chair in Law and the Arts. He was previously chairman of the London Consortium and visiting professor at Birkbeck, University of London.

He serves as trustee to English PEN, the founding centre of a worldwide writers' association. Julius is also chairman of the trustees of Phenomen Trust.

Between 2007 and 2013, Julius played an active role in the campaign against the academic boycott of Israeli universities. In a Guardian article co-authored with historian Simon Schama, Julius wrote "This is not the first boycott call directed at Jews. On 1 April 1933, a week after he came to power, Hitler ordered a boycott of Jewish shops, banks, offices and department stores."

Julius's other activities in this context included representing Ronnie Fraser in an action against the University and College Union (UCU). Fraser, who was a member of the union, complained that it had created an "intimidating", "hostile", "humiliating", and "offensive" environment for Jews. After a  20-day hearing the tribunal rejected his claim, harshly rebuking Julius for "misusing the legal process". Scorn is also invoked for Julius's decision to pursue certain points, with complaints variously dismissed as "palpably groundless", "obviously hopeless" and "devoid of any merit". The Committee for Accuracy in Middle East Reporting in America (CAMERA) criticized the rejection.

Private life
He married Judith Bernie in 1979; the couple had four children, but later divorced. In 1999, he married Dina Rabinovitch and had one child with her. Rabinovitch died in 2007 from breast cancer. In 2009, he married Katarina Lester, and is step-father to her two children. They had a son together in 2011.[11]

Selected publications
 T. S. Eliot, Anti-Semitism and Literary Form (1st edition Cambridge University Press 1995, 2nd edition Thames & Hudson 2003), based on his PhD thesis
 "Art Crimes", in Law and Literature (Oxford University Press 1999) and in Dear Images: Art, Copyright and Culture (Ridinghouse 2003).
 "Love Poetry and the Art of Advocacy" in Critical Quarterly (John Wiley & Sons, 2003)
 "Dickens the lawbreaker" in Critical Quarterly (John Wiley & Sons, 2003)
 Idolising Pictures (Thames & Hudson 2000).
 Transgressions: The Offences of Art (Thames & Hudson 2002).
 Trials of the Diaspora: A History of Anti-Semitism in England (Oxford University Press 2010; paperback edition, with fresh material, 2012). .

References

Sources

Further reading

"The hollow man" The Guardian review of Julius's book on Eliot
Appointment as chair of the London Consortium.
"Engage"
"The Euston Manifesto"
"'Finding Our Voice' Conference"

1956 births
Living people
Academics of Birkbeck, University of London
Academics of University College London
Alumni of Jesus College, Cambridge
Alumni of University College London
English Jews
English solicitor advocates
People educated at the City of London School